Trivirostra hyalina is a species of small sea snail, a marine gastropod mollusk in the family Triviidae, the false cowries or trivias. They are white in colour.

Description
The length of the shell attains 4 mm.

Distribution
This marine species occurs off the Philippines

References

 Fehse D. (2002) Beiträge zur Kenntnis der Triviidae (Mollusca: Gastropoda) V. Kritische Beurteilung der Genera und Beschreibung einer neuen Art der Gattung Semitrivia Cossmann, 1903. Acta Conchyliorum 6: 3-48.
 Fehse D. & Grego J. (2009) Contributions to the knowledge of the Triviidae (Mollusca: Gastropoda). X. The Triviidae from the Red Sea with a description of a new genus Purpurcapsula and a new species in the genus Trivirostra Jousseaume, 1884. Visaya 2(5): 18–79,

Triviidae
Gastropods described in 1933